Shasnur is a rural locality (an ulus) in Okinsky District, Republic of Buryatia, Russia. The population was 50 as of 2010. There is 1 street.

Geography 
Shasnur is located 36 km northwest of Orlik (the district's administrative centre) by road. Khutel is the nearest rural locality.

References 

Rural localities in Okinsky District